Herochroma pseudocristata is a moth of the family Geometridae first described by Hiroshi Inoue in 1999. It is found in the Philippines.

References

Moths described in 1999
Pseudoterpnini
Moths of Asia